Adrien Thibault Marie Rabiot (born 3 April 1995) is a French professional footballer who plays as a central midfielder for  club Juventus and the France national team.

Rabiot spent most of his career with Paris Saint-Germain, making his debut with the first team in 2012 and winning eighteen major honours, including five Ligue 1 titles and a domestic treble in 2015–16 and 2017–18. In 2019, Rabiot signed for Juventus on a free transfer, winning the Serie A title during his first season with the club and the Coppa Italia in his second.

Rabiot was capped 53 times for France at youth level, and made his debut for the senior team in 2016, later taking part at UEFA Euro 2020 and the 2022 FIFA World Cup.

Club career

Paris Saint-Germain

Rabiot was born in Saint-Maurice, Val-de-Marne. He played youth football for several teams, including two spells at Créteil-Lusitanos and a few months at Manchester City. On 2 July 2012, after excelling at the Camp des Loges, he signed his first professional contract agreeing to a three-year deal with Paris Saint-Germain.

Rabiot was promoted to the senior team by manager Carlo Ancelotti ahead of the 2012–13 season. In the club's pre-season he started in the penalty shootout defeat to Barcelona, and, on 26 August, played his first game in Ligue 1, a 0–0 home draw against Bordeaux.

Rabiot made his UEFA Champions League debut on 6 November 2012, playing during injury time in a 4–0 group stage home win over Dinamo Zagreb. In January of the following year he was loaned to fellow league side Toulouse, scoring his first professional goal on 9 March 2013 which was the game's only goal at Brest, from 25 yards.

Returning to PSG, Rabiot contributed with 46 matches and six goals combined as the team won back-to-back domestic leagues from 2013 to 2015, but seemed to be on the verge of leaving the club as his mother Véronique acted as his main advisor during negotiations for a better contract. He started the 2015–16 campaign by getting sent off for two yellow cards after only 29 minutes, in the opening fixture against Lille (eventual away 1–0 win).

Rabiot scored his first goal in European competition on 25 November 2015 to open a 5–0 Champions League group win at Malmö, and repeated the feat the following 9 March in a 2–1 victory over Chelsea at Stamford Bridge, putting PSG into the quarter-finals 4–2 on aggregate. Four days later, he scored in a 9–0 routing at bottom team Troyes that sealed the league title with eight matches remaining.

On 23 April 2016, Rabiot was sent off in the final of the Coupe de la Ligue, a 2–1 win over Lille. The following two seasons combined, he scored four times from 60 appearances and conquered the national championship in 2017–18.

In late October 2018, both Rabiot and Kylian Mbappé were dropped from the starting XI by newly appointed manager Thomas Tuchel after they arrived late to a pre-match meeting. The following January, after refusing to renew his contract and failing to appear for the first team since the previous month, the former midfielder was forced to train with the reserves.

On 14 March 2019, Rabiot was suspended by PSG until the end of the month for going to a nightclub after a 3–1 loss to Manchester United in the Champions League round of 16 which knocked them out of the competition, and for liking an Instagram post by Patrice Evra celebrating United's win.

Juventus
On 1 July 2019, Rabiot signed for Italian Serie A champions Juventus on a free transfer. He made his debut for the club on 24 August, in the team's opening match of the 2019–20 Serie A season, coming on as a second-half substitute for Sami Khedira in a 1–0 away win over Parma.

He scored his first goal for the club on 7 July 2020 – the opening goal in a 4–2 away loss to Milan in Serie A – with a "spectacular finish from the edge of the box – after running with the ball from his own half."

On 9 March 2021, he scored his first Champions League goal with Juventus in a 3–2 win after extra-time against FC Porto in the 2020–21 UEFA Champions League round of 16; however, Juventus were eliminated on away goals.

International career
Rabiot was a member of the France U19 side that reached the final of the 2013 UEFA European Under-19 Championship in Lithuania, losing out to Serbia.

On 13 August 2013, aged just 18, Rabiot made his first appearance for the French under-21 team, starting in a 0–0 friendly draw with Germany in Freiburg. He was on stand by for the full side's UEFA Euro 2016 squad, but did not make the final cut.

Rabiot made his senior debut for France on 15 November 2016 against Ivory Coast, starting and being replaced by Thomas Lemar after 78 minutes of the 0–0 friendly home draw, due to a hamstring injury. On 17 May 2018, he was put on the reserve list by manager Didier Deschamps for the 2018 FIFA World Cup squad. However, he controversially refused to be put on the standby list, emailing the coach and saying he would not "be able to follow the training programme". Noël Le Graët, president of the French Football Federation, commented: "He made a bad decision. He penalises himself and sanctions himself alone."

On 18 May 2021, Rabiot was included in France's 26-man squad for UEFA Euro 2020. He came on as an emergency left back in the final group game against Portugal due to injuries to Lucas Hernandez and Lucas Digne, and retained a starting role as a left wing back in an untested 3–5–2 formation against Switzerland in the last 16; his side lost in a penalty shootout after a 3–3 draw.

On 13 November, Rabiot scored his first international goal in an 8–0 home win over Kazakhstan, which allowed France to qualify for the 2022 FIFA World Cup.

On 22 November 2022, playing against Australia, Rabiot scored France's first goal of the 2022 FIFA World Cup.

Style of play

A tall, strong, and elegant left-footed midfielder, who combines good technique with impressive physical qualities, Rabiot was regarded as a promising player in his youth. He is known for being mobile, hard-working, quick in possession, and for his ability to make late attacking runs off the ball into the penalty box, courtesy of his intelligent movement; he is also a composed passer, who possesses good link-up play and dribbling skills in close spaces, which enables him to create chances for teammates. A modern, well-rounded, and versatile player, with good defensive skills, he is also known for being capable of playing in several different midfield positions, including in a deep, creative holding role as a number 6 in front of the defence (which is not his favoured role, however), as a box-to-box midfielder, on the right flank, and even as an advanced midfield playmaker, although he usually plays as a left–sided offensive-minded central midfielder, known as the mezzala role in Italian football jargon, which is his preferred position. His Juventus manager Massimiliano Allegri has also deployed him as a left winger on occasion.

Despite his talent and ability, however, he has come under criticism in the media over his behaviour off the pitch, and has also been accused in the media of lacking professionalism, as well as having a poor attitude and a difficult character, which has led him to have conflicts with several of his managers.

Career statistics

Club

International

France score listed first, score column indicates score after each Rabiot goal

Honours
Paris Saint-Germain
Ligue 1: 2013–14, 2014–15, 2015–16, 2017–18, 2018–19
Coupe de France: 2014–15, 2015–16, 2016–17, 2017–18
Coupe de la Ligue: 2013–14, 2014–15, 2015–16, 2016–17, 2017–18
Trophée des Champions: 2015, 2016, 2017, 2018

Juventus
Serie A: 2019–20
Coppa Italia: 2020–21
Supercoppa Italiana: 2020

France U19
UEFA European Under-19 Championship runner-up: 2013

France
UEFA Nations League: 2020–21
FIFA World Cup runner-up: 2022

Individual
UEFA European Under-19 Championship Team of the Tournament: 2013

References

External links

Profile at the Juventus F.C. website

1995 births
Living people
People from Saint-Maurice, Val-de-Marne
Footballers from Val-de-Marne
French footballers
Association football midfielders
Paris Saint-Germain F.C. players
Toulouse FC II players
Toulouse FC players
Juventus F.C. players
Ligue 1 players
Serie A players
France youth international footballers
France under-21 international footballers
France international footballers
UEFA Euro 2020 players
2022 FIFA World Cup players
UEFA Nations League-winning players
French expatriate footballers
Expatriate footballers in Italy
French expatriate sportspeople in Italy